The Women's 20 kilometres walk event at the 2013 European Athletics U23 Championships was held in Tampere, Finland, on 10 July.

Medalists

Results

Final
10 July 2013 

Intermediate times:
2 km: 9:37 Nina Ochotnikova 
4 km: 18:54 Natalya Serezhkina 
6 km: 28:02 Natalya Serezhkina 
8 km: 37:08 Natalya Serezhkina 
10 km: 46:05 Lyudmyla Olyanovska 
12 km: 55:01 Natalya Serezhkina 
14 km: 1:03:36 Svetlana Vasilyeva 
16 km: 1:12:21 Svetlana Vasilyeva 
18 km: 1:21:09 Svetlana Vasilyeva

Participation
According to an unofficial count, 23 athletes from 12 countries participated in the event.

References

20 kilometres walk
Racewalking at the European Athletics U23 Championships